Reginald William Wickham (4 March 1871 – 4 December 1952) was an English first-class cricketer.

The son of William Wickham Wickham and his wife, Katherine Henrietta Fairfax, he was born at Wetherby in March 1871. He toured the West Indies with Lord Hawke's XI 1896–97, making his debut in first-class cricket on the tour against Trinidad at Port of Spain. He made six further first-class appearances on the tour, playing further matches against Barbados and British Guiana. Playing primarily as a bowler, he took 24 wickets on the tour at an average of 19.04, with best figues of 5 for 38. These figures, which was his only first-class five wicket haul, came against British Guiana at Georgetown. With the bat, he scored 50 runs with a high score of 20 not out. He married Kathleen Wylie in 1907, with the couple having two children. He died at Harrogate in December 1952.

References

External links

1871 births
1952 deaths
People from Wetherby
English cricketers
Lord Hawke's XI cricketers